Mysteries at the Hotel (formerly Hotel Secrets & Legends) is an American documentary television series that premiered on Sunday, April 6, 2014, on the Travel Channel and ended on June 8, 2014. The series features the secrets and legends hidden in the rooms of the many hotels, motels and resorts in America. The episodes aired every Sunday at 10:00 pm EST.

Premise
Each episode includes dramatic recreations featuring actors re-telling the most mysterious, secret and strange stories and legends from a hotel's history that they do not want their guests to find out. These stories have either have occurred inside the rooms or near America's famous and even not-so-famous hotels.

Opening Introduction: (narrated by Patrick DeLuca):

Episodes

References

External links
 
 
 Hotel Secrets & Legends @ TV.com
 

2014 American television series debuts
2010s American documentary television series
Travel Channel original programming
Television series featuring reenactments